Henry Frederick "Fritz" Schaefer III (born June 8, 1944) is a computational and theoretical chemist. He is one of the most highly cited chemists in the world, with a Thomson Reuters H-Index of 121 as of 2020. He is the Graham Perdue Professor of Chemistry and Director of the Center for Computational Chemistry at the University of Georgia. Before becoming professor at Georgia he was professor at University of California, Berkeley and in 2004, he became Professor of Chemistry Emeritus, at UC Berkeley

Schaefer is a fellow of the American Academy of Arts and Sciences, American Physical Society, American Association for the Advancement of Science, Royal Society of Chemistry, American Chemical Society, and an honorary fellow of the Chemical Research Society of India, among others.
Schaefer is an outspoken Christian. He has described himself as sympathetic to teleological arguments, but primarily a "proponent of Jesus."

Biography

Early life and education
Schaefer was born in Grand Rapids, Michigan, and was educated in Syracuse, New York; Menlo Park, California; and East Grand Rapids, Michigan.

He was awarded a B.S. degree in chemical physics by the Massachusetts Institute of Technology in 1966, where he had the opportunity to work with scientists including George Whitesides, John C. Slater, F. Albert Cotton, Richard C. Lord, and Walter R. Thorson.

He then received a National Defense Education Act Fellowship which enabled him to earn a Ph.D. degree in chemical physics from Stanford University in 1969. At Stanford he worked with Frank E. Harris on ab initio electronic structure theory and quantum chemistry. For his Ph.D. thesis work, he examined the electronic structure of first-row atoms and the oxygen molecule. He published 12 articles in journals including Physical Review and Physical Review Letters prior to defending his dissertation.

Career
Schaefer became an assistant professor of chemistry at the University of California, Berkeley in 1969, with access to Berkeley's Control Data Corporation (CDC) 6600 mainframe computer.  Through collaborations with other researchers, he also gained access to resources at the University Computing Company (UCC) in Palo Alto, which had a UNIVAC 1108.  He worked at Berkeley from 1969 to 1987, with one exception. Schaefer spent 1979-1980 as the Wilfred T. Doherty Professor of Chemistry and inaugural Director of the Institute for Theoretical Chemistry at the University of Texas, Austin, before deciding to return to Berkeley.  During his time at Berkeley, Schaefer published 375 papers and several books, including The Electronic Structure of Atoms and Molecules: A Survey of Rigorous Quantum Mechanical Results (1972) and Quantum Chemistry: The Development of Ab Initio Methods in Molecular Electronic Structure Theory (1984), a survey of research with commentary.

In August 1987, Schaefer moved to the University of Georgia as Graham Perdue Professor of Chemistry and Director of the newly formed Center for Computational Chemistry. With the help of an IBM 3090-200E mainframe (as well as later models) he and his research group developed various computer-based methods for advanced quantum chemistry.

Other academic appointments include Professeur d'Echange at the University of Paris (1977), Gastprofessur at the Eidgenossische Technische Hochshule (ETH), Zurich (1994, 1995, 1997, 2000, 2002, 2004, 2006, 2008, 2010), and David P. Craig Visiting Professor at the Australian National University (1999). In 2004, he became Professor of Chemistry Emeritus, at UC Berkeley.

Schaefer became a member of the International Academy of Quantum Molecular Science (IAQMS) in 1984. 
He was elected president of WATOC (World Association of Theoretical and Computational Chemists) in 1996, and held the position until 2005. He is also a Fellow of the American Physical Society as of 1977,
of the American Association for the Advancement of Science as of 2002,
and of the American Academy of Arts and Sciences as of 2004.

As of January, 2020, Schaefer was the author of more than 1,600 peer-reviewed publications. A majority of these appeared in the Journal of Chemical Physics, the Journal of the American Chemical Society, and the Journal of Physical Chemistry.
He was the editor of  Molecular Physics for 11 years.
He has directed 123 Ph.D. students, as well as many postdoctoral associates and visiting professors, now working at 42 academic institutions around the world.

Research
Research within the Schaefer group involves the use of computational hardware and theoretical methods to solve problems in molecular quantum mechanics.  His contributions to the field of quantum chemistry include a paper challenging, on theoretical grounds, the geometry of triplet methylene as assigned by Nobel Prize-winning experimentalist Gerhard Herzberg; the development of the Z-vector method simplifying certain calculations of correlated systems; and a wide body of work undertaken in his research group on the geometries, properties, and reactions of chemical systems using highly accurate ab initio quantum chemical techniques.  Many of these papers have predicted, or forced a reinterpretation of, experimental results.

Awards and honors

Schaefer was awarded the American Chemical Society's ACS Award in Pure Chemistry in 1979 "for the development of computational quantum chemistry into a reliable quantitative field of chemistry and for prolific exemplary calculations of broad chemical interest". The Pure Chemistry Award is given to the outstanding chemist in America under the age of 35. In 1983, he received the Leo Hendrik Baekeland award for the most distinguished North American chemist under the age of 40. In 1992, he was awarded the Centenary Prize of the Royal Society of Chemistry, London, with a citation that included "the first theoretical chemist successfully to challenge the accepted conclusion of a distinguished experimental group for a polyatomic molecule, namely methylene."

In 2003, Schaefer received the American Chemical Society Award in Theoretical Chemistry and the Ira Remsen Award of Johns Hopkins University. In 2004, a six-day conference was convened in Gyeongju, Korea on the “Theory and Applications of Computational Chemistry: A Celebration of 1000 Papers of Professor Henry F. Schaefer III.”  Schaefer was honored with the $10,000 Joseph O. Hirschfelder Prize in 2005 by the University of Wisconsin's Theoretical Chemistry Institute, joining a distinguished list of some of the best-known scientists in the field.

In 2011, Schaefer received the prestigious Ide P. Trotter Prize of Texas A&M University. Previous recipients of the Trotter Prize include Nobelists Francis Crick, Charles Townes, Steven Weinberg, William Phillips, and Roald Hoffmann. 
In 2012, he received a Humboldt Research Award from the Alexander von Humboldt Foundation in Germany, and on March 29, 2012, he received the $20,000 SURA Distinguished Scientist Award, given to the outstanding scientist in any field in the 17 Southern states of the US, for fulfilling SURA's mission of fostering excellence in scientific research.

In 2013, Schaefer received the Chemical Pioneer Award of the American Institute of Chemists.
On March 18, 2014, Professor Schaefer received the American Chemical Society Peter Debye Award in Physical Chemistry.
In March 2015, Professor Schaefer was elected as an Honorary Fellow of the Chemical Research Society of India. He returned to India to give his CRSI Honorary Fellow award lecture on February 6, 2016, at Panjab University in Chandigarh.
Schaefer received the American Institute of Chemists Gold Medal on May 8, 2019.

Religion and science
Schaefer is also an active Protestant Christian educator who regularly speaks to university audiences (over 500 to date), Christian groups and the public on science/faith issues.  In 2003, he published Science and Christianity: Conflict or Coherence?, a collection of essays and talks on the subject. A second edition appeared in 2016. He is a member of the Christian Faculty Forum at the University of Georgia.

Controversy

On January 25. 2008, Schaefer was invited to present a lecture entitled 'The Big Bang, Stephen Hawking and God' at the Indian Institute of Technology Bombay, during TECHFEST, Asia's largest technology festival. This evoked a response from a group of six atheist students in the form of handbills. Schaefer was, however, invited to return to IIT Bombay to present an Institute Lecture in February 2014. In 2016, Schaefer was again invited to present a plenary lecture at TECHFEST. His lecture on December 17, "The Life of a Scientist," was presented to a large audience without incident. On December 14, 2018, Schaefer gave another plenary lecture at TECHFEST.

There has been some controversy concerning the designation of Schaefer as a "five-time nominee for the Nobel Prize."  The original source of this estimate is a December 23, 1991 cover article from U.S. News & World Report. 
The names of nominees and other information about the Nobel nomination process cannot be revealed for 50 years following the nomination discussions, so such a designation is speculative.

Published books

References

External links
 The Center for Computational Quantum Chemistry Group Page
 Henry F. Schaefer, PhD: UGA
 HENRY F. SCHAEFER III: IAQMS
 Henry Schaefer, Fellow-CSC: Discovery Institute
 Dr. Henry F. "Fritz" Schaefer III: Leadership U
 Public Lectures by Henry F. Schaefer III
 Public Lectures by Henry F. Schaefer III Doc/PDF
 Henry F. Schaefer III: Google Scholar

1944 births
Living people
Fellows of the American Academy of Arts and Sciences
21st-century American chemists
American Protestants
Christian scholars
Theoretical chemists
Discovery Institute fellows and advisors
Massachusetts Institute of Technology School of Science alumni
Stanford University alumni
University of Georgia faculty
Academic staff of ETH Zurich
Intelligent design advocates
Fellows of the International Society for Complexity, Information, and Design
Members of the International Academy of Quantum Molecular Science
Schrödinger Medal recipients
Computational chemists
People from Grand Rapids, Michigan
Fellows of the American Association for the Advancement of Science
Fellows of the American Physical Society
Presidents of the World Association of Theoretical and Computational Chemists